Vandover and the Brute is a novel by Frank Norris, written in 1894–5 and first published in 1914.

Notes

Further reading

 Fusco, Katherine (2009). "Brute Time: Anti-Modernism in Vandover and the Brute," Studies in American Naturalism, Vol. 4, No. 1, pp. 22–40.
 Hartwick, Harry (1934). "Norris and the Brute." In: The Foreground of American Fiction. New York: American Book Company, pp. 45–66.
 Jennings, Randee Dax (2014). "The Economy of Affect in Frank Norris’s Vandover and the Brute," Studies in the Novel, Vol. 46, No. 3, pp. 335–353.
 King, Christine Harvey (1997). "Humor Separates the Artist from the Bungler in 'Vandover and the Brute'," American Literary Realism, 1870-1910, Vol. 29, No. 2, pp. 14–26.
 Pizer, Donald (1961). "Evolutionary Ethical Dualism in Frank Norris' Vandover and the Brute and McTeague," PMLA, Vol. 76, No. 5, pp. 552–560.
 Williams, Sherwood (1990). "The Rise of a New Degeneration: Decadence and Atavism in Vandover and the Brute," ELH, Vol. 57, No. 3, pp. 709–736.

External links
 Vandover and the Brute at Project Gutenberg
 Vandover and the Brute at Internet Archive
 Vandover and the Brute at Hathi Trust
 

1914 American novels
Novels by Frank Norris
Doubleday, Page & Company books